Events from the year 1792 in Scotland.

Incumbents

Law officers 
 Lord Advocate – Robert Dundas of Arniston
 Solicitor General for Scotland – Robert Blair

Judiciary 
 Lord President of the Court of Session – Lord Succoth
 Lord Justice General – The Viscount Stormont
 Lord Justice Clerk – Lord Braxfield

Events 
 "Year of the Sheep" in the Scottish Highlands: mass emigration of crofters following Clearances for grazing.
 4 June – King's birthday riot in Edinburgh.
 26 July – Associated Friends of the People for Parliamentary Reform constituted in Edinburgh.
 13 November – Successes of the French Revolutionary Army are celebrated with bonfires and bell-ringing in Dundee and Perth causing the 42nd Regiment of Foot to be sent north to the towns.
 11 December – First National Convention of the Scottish Friends of the People meets in Edinburgh to demand parliamentary reform.
 The first steam winding engine at a Scottish colliery is erected at Barrachnie in the Monklands coalfield.
 Clachan Bridge, connecting Seil to the mainland, is built to the design of John Stevenson of Oban revised by Robert Mylne.

Births 
 19 February – Roderick Murchison, geologist (died 1871)
 22 June – James Beaumont Neilson, ironmaster (died 1865)
 4 August – Edward Irving, founder of the Catholic Apostolic Church (died 1834)
 20 October – Colin Campbell, army officer (died 1863)
 date unknown – John Gillies, botanist (died 1834)

Deaths
 January – Jenny Clow ("Clarinda"), domestic servant, a mistress and muse of Robert Burns, of tuberculosis (born 1766)
 3 March – Robert Adam, architect (born 1728)
 10 March – John Stuart, 3rd Earl of Bute, Prime Minister of Great Britain (born 1713)
 29 April – George Vanden-Bempde, 3rd Marquess of Annandale (born 1720)
 25 June – John Adam, architect (born 1721)
 18 July – John Paul Jones, Scottish-born sailor and the United States' first well-known naval fighter in the American Revolution (born 1747)
 19 December – Mary Bulkley, actress (born 1747 or 1748 in England)

The arts
 29 September – opening of Theatre Royal, Dumfries as The Theatre. By the 21st century this will be the oldest working theatre in Scotland.
 Robert Burns composes the song "Highland Mary".
 Publication of The Poetical Works of Janet Little, the Scotch Milkmaid.

References 

 
Scotland
1790s in Scotland